WKT is a sealing compound which was developed by Paul Pietzschke, Chemisch-Technische Fabrik, Hamburg, Germany in 1962. It was made specifically to meet the stringent requirements in the yacht and ship building industry. WKT belongs to the silicone group of sealants.

About WKT 
WKT is a highly elastic and non-ageing sealant. WKT is a silicone rubber and one of the first fully synthetic sealants for the commercial marine industry.  The active ingredient in WKT sealing compound is polydimethylsiloxane. Today, WKT is being used in countless applications such as the construction and building industry, windows and glazing, interior industry, plant engineering and construction, grommet maintenance, manufacturing industry, recreational vehicles (RV) and aircraft industries.

Characteristics  
WKT is extremely UV resistant and maintains its high elasticity and adhesive force both in tropical and arctic climates even after years of exposure to such weather conditions. In addition, does not lose its elasticity under constantly varying mechanical stress.

Safety  
WKT is free of solvents, heavy metals, isocyanates and oximes and is not subject to marking as hazardous goods. WKT in its cured form is physiologically harmless.

Other types of sealants 
 Acrylic sealants
 Polysulfide sealants
 Polyurethane sealants

See also 
 Paul Pietzschke
 Sealant

External links 
 Paul Pietzschke, Hamburg
 WKT in the USA

References 

Adhesives
Brand name materials